Music from Two Basses is an album by bassists Dave Holland and Barre Phillips recorded in 1971 and released on the ECM label. It was the third project in Holland’s long relationship with ECM.

Reception
The Allmusic review by Thom Jurek awarded the album 5 stars stating "this historic date features the two British bassists engaged while at the top of their powers, exploring not only tonality and the dynamic and harmonic possibilities that exist between two double basses, but also the expanded notions of how the different players' styles and musical intuitions dovetail, rather than work in opposition... There is simply no bass recording like this one, and over 30 years after its release, it is still a classic, an astonishing look at how intimate and instinctive musical communication can really be".

Track listing
All compositions by Dave Holland except as indicated
 "Improvised Piece I" (Holland, Phillips) - 10:33 
 "Improvised Piece II" (Holland, Phillips) - 7:46 
 "Beans" (Phillips) - 3:10 
 "Raindrops" - 4:13 
 "May Be I Can Sing It for You" (Phillips) - 1:48 
 "Just a Whisper" - 4:57 
 "Song for Clare" - 4:52

Personnel
David Holland — bass, cello
Barre Phillips — bass

References

ECM Records albums
Dave Holland albums
Barre Phillips albums
1971 albums
Albums produced by Manfred Eicher